Fabrice Santoro was the defending champion, but chose not to compete this year.Dustin Brown won in the final 7–6(7–2), 6–3 against Izak van der Merwe.

Seeds

Draw

Finals

Top half

Bottom half

References
Main Draw
Qualifying Singles

Soweto Open - Singles
2010 Men's Singles